Giselle Soler (born 4 May 1997) is an Argentinian artistic roller skater.

Soler competed at the Pan American Games in 2015, where she won a gold medal in the free skating event,
and in 2019, where she won a silver medal in the same event.

References

1997 births
Living people
Argentine artistic roller skaters
Roller figure skaters at the 2015 Pan American Games
Roller figure skaters at the 2019 Pan American Games
Pan American Games gold medalists for Argentina
Pan American Games silver medalists for Argentina
Pan American Games medalists in roller skating
Female roller skaters
Argentine sportswomen
Medalists at the 2015 Pan American Games
Medalists at the 2019 Pan American Games